Michael Mirdad is a spiritual and metaphysical teacher, keynote speaker, self-help and new age author, and an intuitive healer and counselor who specializes in Christ consciousness, spiritual mastery, healthy relationships, sacred sexuality, spiritual healing, and A Course in Miracles. His teaching encourages the awareness of love, and light. Currently serving as the Spiritual Leader at Unity of Sedona, he has worked as a healer and sexual counselor for over 35 years and is the author of the books: The Seven Initiations of the Spiritual Path, The Heart of a Course in Miracles, Sacred Sexuality: A Manual for Living Bliss, You’re Not Going Crazy, You’re Just Waking Up,  An Introduction to Tantra and Sacred Sexuality, Healing the Heart & Soul: A Five-Step, Soul-Level Healing Process for Transforming Your Life, The Book of Love and Forgiveness and Creating Fulfilling Relationships.

Teachings
Michael Mirdad has facilitated thousands of classes, lectures, and workshops throughout the world on mastery, spirituality, relationships, A Course in Miracles, and healing. He has been featured as a keynote speaker in expos and conferences worldwide, and has been interviewed on many radio, television, and internet programs. His work has been published in magazines including Conscious Life Times, Whole Self Times, Sedona Journal, Yoga Journal, Evolve magazine, and OM Times Magazine.

Books
Michael Mirdad has written eight books to date that aim to assist readers on the path to wholeness and help them live lives of balance and peace. The topics relate to teachings found in A Course in Miracles including spiritual initiation, unconditional love, personal transformation and soul-level healing.

 The Seven Initiations of the Spiritual Path (published March 31, 2004) 
 Sacred Sexuality: A Manual for Living Bliss (published August 21, 2004) 
 You're Not Going Crazy...You're Just Waking Up! (published November 3, 2008) 
 An Introduction To Tantra And Sacred Sexuality (published November 8, 2008) 
 Healing the Heart & Soul: A Five-Step, Soul-Level Healing Process for Transforming Your Life (published May 17, 2011) 
 Creating Fulfilling Relationships (published April 1, 2014) 
 The Heart of a Course in Miracles (published April 30, 2016)  
 The Book of Love and Forgiveness (published April 4, 2017)

References

External links 
 Official Web Site of Michael Mirdad
 Universal Lightworkers
 Unity of Sedona

Spiritual teachers
Living people
American self-help writers
American spiritual writers
New Age spiritual leaders
Year of birth missing (living people)